The 1956 Major League Baseball season was contested from April 17 to October 10, 1956, featuring eight teams in the National League and eight teams in the American League.  The 1956 World Series was a rematch of the previous year's series between the New York Yankees and the Brooklyn Dodgers.  The series is notable for Yankees pitcher Don Larsen's perfect game in Game 5.

Standings

American League

National League

Postseason

Bracket

Awards and honors

Statistical leaders

Feats

Triple Crown
Mickey Mantle, New York Yankees – Mantle won the Major League Triple Crown by leading both leagues in batting average (.353), home runs (52), and runs batted in (130).  Mantle became the first player to win a Triple Crown since Ted Williams in 1947.

Milestones
On April 18, 1956, umpire Ed Rommel was the first umpire to wear glasses in a Major League game. The game was played between the New York Yankees and the Washington Senators.

Managers

American League

National League

Home Field Attendance

Notable events

July–September
September 21 – The New York Yankees set a Major League record by leaving 20 players on base against the Boston Red Sox at Fenway Park.

October–December
December 6–8 – Major League owners meet in Chicago. Cleveland general manager and minority-owner Hank Greenberg proposed implementing limited Interleague play beginning in 1958. Under Greenberg's proposal, each team would continue to play 154-games in a season, 126 of which would be within their league, and 28 against the eight clubs in the other league. The interleague games would all be played during a period immediately following the All-Star Game. The proposal was not adopted.

Notes

See also
1956 Nippon Professional Baseball season

References

External links
1956 Major League Baseball season schedule

 
Major League Baseball seasons